Bradley Porter (born 19 February 1987) is a footballer, who currently plays for Central Coast United.

Club career
Porter first came to the Mariners late in the 2005–06 A-League season for a four-week stay as cover for the crippling injury toll that the team experienced, but had a season-ending injury himself days prior to debuting.

Signed again for the 2006–07 campaign, the youngster did not get more than a handful of substitute appearances in the first 2/3 of the season as the Mariners defense was having another great year. However, as the season wound down, the Mariners lost key players at crucial times and scorers lost form. Brad received  several starts at the latter end of the season, against quality opposition such as Melbourne Victory FC and Adelaide United FC, because of this and impressed many of the other players with his versatility, strength and skill. For the 2007–08 A-league season, Mariners' coach Lawrie McKinna made it clear the Mariners would hold onto this quality talent, and that he would be a major part of the campaign, hopefully filling the place vacated by Noel Spencer. In 2010/11, a serious knee injury kept Porter sidelined for the whole season.

On 14 October 2007 Porter was sent off after receiving a red card for a sliding tackle. Porter played with the Mariners feeder club and NSW Super League side Central Coast Lightning. On 11 July 2012, Porter announced his retirement due to his inability to overcome long term injury problems.

Post-football career
In 2013, Porter joined the coaching staff at the International Football School in Kariong, New South Wales and took on a First Grade coaching role for Central Coast Premier League team Kanwal Warnervale Rovers

Honours
With Central Coast Mariners:
  A-League Premiership: 2007–2008, 2011–2012

References

External links
 Central Coast Mariners profile
 FFA – Olyroo profile

1987 births
Living people
People from Gosford
Australian soccer players
Australia youth international soccer players
Australia under-20 international soccer players
Association football midfielders
Central Coast Mariners FC players
A-League Men players
Australian Institute of Sport soccer players
Sportsmen from New South Wales
Soccer players from New South Wales